Mnuchin is a family name, derived from the Jewish female given name Menucha (Menuha, Minucha, Minicha, depending on dialect), and may refer to:

Steven Mnuchin, American banker, film producer, political fundraiser, and 77th United States Secretary of the Treasury
Robert Mnuchin, American banker, art dealer and gallerist
Moshe Menuhin, born Moshe Mnuchin, the great-great-grandson of Shneur Zalman of Liadi, the founder of Chabad Hassidism.

See also

Menuhin

External links
"How Steven Mnuchin Got His Unusual Name" on Haaretz

Surnames